Meara may refer to:
 Meara (name)
 Meara, a fictional kingdom described in the Deryni novels of Katherine Kurtz
 Meara (worm), a genus of acoela worms.

See also 
 O'Meara, a common surname
 Meera
 Mara (name)